Ömer Ali Şahiner (born 2 January 1992) is a Turkish footballer who plays as a midfielder for İstanbul Başakşehir. He made his Süper Lig debut on 17 August 2013 against Fenerbahçe.

Career

Youth career 
Şahiner started his debut youth career at Karabağ GB. He moved to Konya Şekerspor in 2007. While he was playing in youth team, first team scouts suggested him to first team.

Konya Şekerspor 
On 26 November 2015, Şahiner made his debut against Mersin İdman Yurdu. Also he became a starter in his first season.

Konyaspor 
In 2012–13 season, Şahiner contracted with Konyaspor for 5 years. He left the club on 26 January 2021.

İstanbul Başakşehir 
Şahiner joined İstanbul Başakşehir on 26 January 2021.

International
He made his Turkey national football team debut on 2 June 2019, in a friendly against Uzbekistan, as a half-time substitute for Efecan Karaca.

Honours

Konyaspor
Turkish Cup (1): 2016–17
Turkish Super Cup (1):  2017

References

External links 
 Ömer Ali Şahiner at TFF.org
 
 
 

1992 births
Living people
Turkish footballers
Turkey under-21 international footballers
Turkey youth international footballers
Turkey international footballers
1922 Konyaspor footballers
Konyaspor footballers
Süper Lig players
TFF First League players
TFF Second League players
People from Yenişehir, Bursa
Association football midfielders